The A.G. Grant Homestead in Grove City, Franklin County, Ohio, United States, was built around 1840.  It was listed on the U.S. National Register of Historic Places in 1998.

History
Adam Gabriel Grant was one of the most influential residents of the Grove City area. He helped develop the interurban train system, bought the first bicycle and made Grove City's first long-distance call. He is seen in several photos with his signature bowler hat.

Prior to 1840, a log cabin existed on the property. This farm house built was built with clay found on the land and still stands on the end of Park Street on what is now Haughn Road. The last decedent of the family, Ruth V. Jividen, died on April 14, 2014, at the age of 98.

Current Status
The Government of Grove City purchased the home for the creation of a museum. It would cost about $1 million over 10 years to transform the property into a history museum.

References

Houses on the National Register of Historic Places in Ohio
Houses completed in 1840
Houses in Franklin County, Ohio
National Register of Historic Places in Franklin County, Ohio
1840 establishments in Ohio